Thanksgiving is a 2004 American short film directed by Tom Donahue and starring Yolonda Ross, William Mahoney and James Urbaniak.

Premise 
Yolonda (Yolonda Ross) is a young woman fleeing an unwanted commitment. She finds refuge in an isolated motel out of town, which is due for demolition in the morning, and there confronts a mysterious man named Peck (Mahoney), who is the caretaker of the old motel with a strange past.

Cast 
Yolonda Ross - Yolonda
William Mahoney - Peck
James Urbaniak - Willy
Seymour Cassel - Del
Kat Foster (as Kathy Foster) - Nadine
Jake Robards - Young Peck

External links
 

2004 films
2004 drama films
American independent films
2004 short films
Thanksgiving in films
American drama short films
2004 independent films
Films directed by Tom Donahue (filmmaker)
2000s English-language films
2000s American films